Jamal Najar Strong (born August 5, 1978) is a former Major League Baseball outfielder.

Strong was drafted by the Seattle Mariners in the 6th round of the 2000 Major League Baseball Draft. Strong became a free agent after the 2005 season and signed with the Chicago Cubs. The Cubs released him on April 25, and he signed with the Atlanta Braves on April 28. On June 6, the Ducks traded him to the Camden Riversharks for pitcher Abe Alvarez.

On April 26, 2005, Strong became the fourth baseball player to be suspended for testing positive on illegal performance-enhancing drugs under Major League Baseball's new drug policy. He was suspended for 10 days without pay as the policy dictates for a first offense.

See also
List of sportspeople sanctioned for doping offences

References

External links

1978 births
Living people
African-American baseball players
American sportspeople in doping cases
Arizona League Mariners players
Baseball players from Pasadena, California
Everett AquaSox players
Iowa Cubs players
Long Island Ducks players
Major League Baseball players suspended for drug offenses
Major League Baseball outfielders
Nebraska Cornhuskers baseball players
Richmond Braves players
St. Louis Cardinals scouts
San Antonio Missions players
San Bernardino Stampede players
Scranton/Wilkes-Barre Yankees players
Seattle Mariners players
Tacoma Rainiers players
Trenton Thunder players
Wisconsin Timber Rattlers players
Peoria Javelinas players
21st-century African-American sportspeople
20th-century African-American sportspeople
Pasadena High School (California) alumni